John Oliver (1913 – 10 February 1991) was an English professional footballer who played in the Football League for Burnley.

Career statistics
Source:

References

1913 births
1991 deaths
Footballers from Gateshead
English footballers
Association football defenders
Gateshead A.F.C. players
Walker Celtic F.C. players
Stoke City F.C. players
Spennymoor United F.C. players
Burnley F.C. players
English Football League players